Palm Beach Pumas was an American soccer team based in West Palm Beach, Florida, United States. Founded in 2000, the team played in the USL Premier Development League (PDL), the fourth tier of the American Soccer Pyramid, until 2008, when the franchise folded and the team left the league.

The team played its home games at the Palm Beach International Polo Club in nearby Wellington, Florida, and at the Lauderhill Sports Complex in Fort Lauderdale, Florida. The team's colors were blue, white and orange.

History

Year-by-year

Head coaches
  Bobby Lennon (2005–2006, 2008)
  Gerry Queen (2007)

Stadia
 Stadium at Palm Beach Community College, Lake Worth, Florida (2003–2005)
 Lantana Sports Complex, Lantana, Florida (2003)
 Stadium at Forest Hill Community High School, West Palm Beach, Florida (2005)
 Palm Beach International Polo Club, Wellington, Florida (2006–2008)
 Lauderhill Sports Complex, Fort Lauderdale, Florida (2008)

Average Attendances
2008: 114
2007: 88
2006: 240
2005: 90

References

External links
 Palm Beach Pumas

Soccer clubs in Florida
Defunct Premier Development League teams
2000 establishments in Florida
2008 disestablishments in Florida
Association football clubs established in 2000
Association football clubs disestablished in 2008